The 1940 San Diego State Aztecs football team represented San Diego State College during the 1940 college football season.

San Diego State competed in the California Collegiate Athletic Association (CCAA). The 1940 team was led by head coach Leo B. Calland in his sixth season with the Aztecs. They played home games at two sites, Aztec Bowl and Balboa Stadium in San Diego, California. The Aztecs finished the season with five wins, three losses and one tie (5–3–1, 1–1–1 CCAA). Overall, the team outscored its opponents 128–87 for the season.

Schedule

Team players in the NFL
No San Diego State players were selected in the 1941 NFL Draft.

Notes

References

San Diego State
San Diego State Aztecs football seasons
San Diego State Aztecs football